Boy Scouts or Boy Scout may refer to:

 Boy Scouts, members, sections or organisations in the Scouting Movement
 Scout (Scouting), a boy or a girl participating in the worldwide Scouting movement
 Are You Tougher Than a Boy Scout?, an American reality television series
 The Last Boy Scout, a 1991 action film starring Bruce Willis
 Boy Scout Lane, an isolated road located in Stevens Point, Wisconsin, mentioned in various ghost stories
 Boy Scout Preserve, a park in Pasco County, Florida.
 USS Boy Scout (SP-53), a U.S. Navy section patrol craft in service from 1916 to c. 1920
 The Boy Scouts of America organization or a member of it.  
 A member of a particular program within the Boy Scouts of America organization. The program was previously named "Boy Scouts" and is now named Scouts BSA

See also
 Scout (disambiguation)